"Crazy About You" may refer to

"Crazy About You" (Minimoni song), 2003 single by Minimoni
"Crazy About You", 1980 song by Adrian Baker  
"Crazy About You", 1988 song by Tomas Ledin
"Crazy About You", 2000 song by Luna Sea from the album Lunacy

See also
 It Ain't Cool to Be Crazy About You
 Crazy for You (Madonna song), Madonna song 1985